The 1999–2000 Taça de Portugal was the 60th edition of the Portuguese football knockout tournament, organized by the Portuguese Football Federation (FPF). The 1999–2000 Taça de Portugal began in September 1999. The final was played on 21 May and replayed four days later as the inaugural match ended tied at the Estádio Nacional.

Beira-Mar were the previous holders, having defeated Campomaiorense 1–0 in the previous season's final. The Auri-negros were eliminated in the fourth round by second division side Imortal. Porto defeated Sporting CP, 2–0 in the cup final replay to win their tenth Taça de Portugal. As a result of Porto winning the domestic cup competition, the Dragões faced 1999–2000 Primeira Liga winners Porto in the 2000 Supertaça Cândido de Oliveira.

Fifth Round
Ties were played on the 9–12 January. Replays were played on the 19 January. Gil Vicente took a bye to the next round.

Sixth Round
Ties were played on the 25–26 January. Replays were played on the 2 February. Porto took a bye to the next round.

Quarter-finals
Ties were played on the 9 February.

Semi-finals
Ties were played on the 12 April.

Final

Replay

References

Taça de Portugal seasons
Taca De Portugal, 1999-2000
1999–2000 domestic association football cups